Devendran also known as Ravi Devendran is an Indian music composer who is concentrating in Tamil-language films. He is known for the melodious composition of chartbuster Kannukkul Nooru Nilava... from the Bharathiraja directed film Vedham Pudhithu released in the year 1987.

Career 
Born and brought up in Vadakarai, near Srivilliputhur, Devendran took lessons in Carnatic and Hindustani music under Sivagiri, Seema Durai and Madhusoodhanan and in Western music under Thompson.

Going down the memory lane, he said, "I was working a music teacher at a school in Thiruvottiyur. With the support of principal Pushpam Amalraj, I was imparting music knowledge to students there when Sundararajan came to the school as the chief guest for a function."

"Impressed by a song performed by the students, which was composed by me, the popular director announced at the function itself that I would be the music composer of his next project."

"However, since the project could not take off as announced, producer Kovai Thambi gave me the opportunity to make my debut as a music composer with Mannukkul Vairam. For the film, I slightly changed the song which I composed for the school function and it was the hit number Pongiyadhey kadhal vellam..."

Throwing light on how he composed ‘Kannukkul nooru nilava...’, Devendran said, "I initially composed a fusion tune for the particular song in Vedham Pudhidhu and went for recording. However, Bharathiraja insisted me to rework on it. Since the time is too short, I modified it to a certain extent which was appreciated by the director. Thus born Kannukkul nooru nilava."

Partial filmography 
Films

Serials
Roja (2003) (Jaya TV)
Thekkathi Ponnu (2008) (Kalaignar TV) (Background score only)

References

External links 

Living people
Tamil film score composers
Telugu film score composers
Year of birth missing (living people)